Friherre Jonas Magnus Alströmer (21 August 1877 – 30 November 1955) was a Swedish diplomat and chamberlain. He served as envoy in a number of European countries between 1922 and 1933.

Career
Alströmer was born on 21 August 1877 at Åkersta in Lunda parish, Nyköping Municipality, Sweden, the son of Friherre Jonas Alströmer, a factory manager, and his wife Sigrid Björkenheim. He received a Bachelor of both laws degree at Uppsala University in 1903 and did his clerkship from 1903 to 1906. Alströmer was assistant at the Ministry of Agriculture in 1906 and was acting legal clerk (domänfiskal) at the Swedish Forest Service (Domänstyrelsen) in 1907. He then became Second Secretary at the Ministry for Foreign Affairs in 1908 and First Secretary in 1912. Alströmer was appointed chamberlain in 1914 and acting head of department in 1914 as well as acting legation counselor in Paris in 1917. He served as first legation secretary in Kristiania in 1918 and acting legation secretary in Paris the same year. Alströmer was appointed acting legation secretary in London on 10 December 1918 and then served as acting chargé d'affaires there from 18 December 1918 to 4 November 1919.

Alströmer became legation counselor in London in 1919, and in 1920 he was the Swedish Red Cross' representative at the International Law Association's conference in Portsmouth. The same year, Alströmer was delegated at a conference in London on the continued publication of the international catalog of natural science literature in 1920. He was also a member of the international committee for the preparation of proposals for international regulations concerning prisoners of war treatment from 1920 to 1921. The same year he became resident minister at the Ministry for Foreign Affairs in Stockholm and head of the personnel and administrative department. He then served as consul general in Shanghai and consular judge from 16 December 1921 to 17 March 1922. He was appointed envoy extraordinary and minister plenipotentiary in Bern on 28 August 1922, also accredited to Vienna and Budapest from 27 September 1924. Alströmer was delegated at the International Red Cross Conference in Geneva in 1923 and 1925. Alströmer became acting envoy in Bucharest, Athens and Belgrade in 1925. He was representative of the trade treaty negotiation with Greece in 1926 and with Romania from 1930 to 1931. Alströmer was also representative in negotiations with Greece regarding ship's survey from 1928 to 1929 and clearing agreements in 1932.

Personal life
On 27 November 1908 in Malmö, he married Vera Elisabet Axelson (born 13 March 1889 in Malmö), in her first married, from which he was divorced. She was the daughter of the wholesaler Severin Magnus Axelson and Hulda Lovisa Augusta Malmström. On 19 July 1921 in London, he married Rigmor Maria Tvermoes (born 11 October 1879 in Copenhagen, died 9 September 1925 in Bern, buried in Copenhagen), in her third marriage. She was the daughter of Godtfred Ferdinand Tvermoes and Matilde Esskildsen. On 11 July 1936 in Vreta kloster socken, Östergötland County, with Ebba Jeanette Adine Peyron (born 14 January 1883 in Helsingborg), in her second marriage. She was the daughter of the major and friherre Gustaf Fredrik Peyron and Ebba Eleonora Charlotta Augusta Hallenborg.

He was the owner of Naddö mansion in Vadstena Municipality.

He was an honorary citizen of Nauplion in Greece.

Awards and decorations

Swedish
   King Oscar II and Queen Sofia's Golden Wedding Medal (6 June 1907)
   King Gustaf V's Jubilee Commemorative Medal (1948)
   King Gustaf V's Jubilee Commemorative Medal (1928)
   Commander Grand Cross of the Order of the Polar Star (16 June 1933)
  King Gustaf V Olympic Commemorative Medal (Konung Gustaf V:s olympiska minnesmedalj) (1912)

Foreign
   Grand Cross of the Order of the Dannebrog (9 March 1931)
   Grand Cross of the Order of the Phoenix (between 1931 and 1935)
   Grand Cross of the Order of St. Sava (between 1928 and 1931)
   Grand Cross of the Order of the Crown (between 1931 and 1935)
  First Class of the Hungarian Cross of Merit (1926)
   Grand Officer of the Order of Orange-Nassau (1922)
   Commander of the Order of Saint Alexander (between 1921 and 1925)
   Commander of the Order of the Crown of Italy (1913)
   Officer of the Order of the Crown (1910)
   Officer of the Legion of Honour (1920)
   Knight Third Class of the Order of the Crown (1908)
   Knight Third Class of the Order of Saint Anna (1909)
   Fourth Class of the Order of the White Elephant (1916)
   Knight Third Class of the Order of the Iron Crown (1909)

References

1877 births
1955 deaths
Consuls-general of Sweden
Ambassadors of Sweden to Switzerland
Ambassadors of Sweden to Hungary
Ambassadors of Sweden to Austria
Ambassadors of Sweden to Romania
Ambassadors of Sweden to Greece
Ambassadors of Sweden to Yugoslavia
People from Nyköping Municipality
Uppsala University alumni
Commanders Grand Cross of the Order of the Polar Star